Arco (ARDM-5) is an  Medium Auxiliary floating drydock for repair and serviced the United States Navy.

Arco was laid down on 9 May 1983 by Todd Pacific Shipyards in Seattle, Washington, and launched on 14 December 1984.  She was placed in service on 23 June 1986 at Naval Base San Diego.  She provides dry dock services for the nuclear-powered submarines of Submarine Squadron Eleven in the Pacific, as well as other small craft.

Sources
Arco's official homepage
DANFS: Arco

Service Ship Photo Archive: ARDM-5 Arco

 

Ships built in Seattle
1984 ships
Floating drydocks of the United States Navy